Saint-Hilaire, also known as Saint-Hilaire du Touvet, is a former commune in the Isère department in southeastern France. On 1 January 2019, it was merged into the new commune Plateau-des-Petites-Roches.

It is made up of the three smaller settlements of Saint-Hilaire, Les Margains and Les Gaudes, and its inhabitants are called the Saint-Hilairois (Saint-Hilairoises).

The commune is situated on the Plateau des Petites Roches, a natural balcony above the valley of the Isère, on the east side of the Massif de la Chartreuse and overlooked by the peak of the Dent de Crolles.

Saint-Hilaire is linked to Montfort, situated on the road between Grenoble and Chambéry in the valley below, by the Funiculaire de Saint-Hilaire du Touvet. Until this was opened in 1924, the village was accessible only on foot, or by mule. The funicular was constructed principally to serve several sanatoriums built at the same time to house tuberculosis patients. A road has long since been opened, and the funicular is now used mostly by tourists and paragliders.

Population

See also
Communes of the Isère department

References

External links
Non-official page about Saint-Hilaire

Former communes of Isère
Isère communes articles needing translation from French Wikipedia